Fabric 29 is a DJ mix compilation album by Tiefschwarz.  It is part of the Fabric Mix Series.

Track listing
  Louder Bach aka Troy Pierce - Grace (Anxiety) - Underl_ne (5:59)
  Claude VonStroke - Who's Afraid of Detroit? - Dirtybird (5:43)
  Tiefschwarz - Damage (M.A.N.D.Y. Remix) - Fine (6:22)
  Theodor Zox - Extruder (Maetrik Remix) - Tic Tac Toe (4:27)
  Touane - Bassic - Persona (5:27)
  Thomas Schumacher - Rotor - Spiel Zeug (5:40)
  Night On Earth - Rondell - Kickboxer (5:06)
  GummiHz - A.A.K.N.Y. - Mobilee (2:49)
  Inchundu - Hey - Souvenir (6:19)
  Jamie Jones - Amazon - Freak 'N' Chic (4:17)
  Sleeper Thief - Freefall - 64 Records (4:25)
  Depeche Mode - John The Revelator (Dave Is In The Disco Dub) - Mute (6:48)
  Riton - The Hammer of Thor - Souvenir (5:52)
  Kate Wax - Beetles and Spiders (Roman Flügel Remix) - Mental Groove'' (3:40)

References

External links
Fabric: Fabric 29

Fabric (club) albums
2006 compilation albums